John Brown Jr. may refer to:
 John A. Brown Jr. (–1997), American murderer executed in Louisiana
 John H. Brown Jr. (1891–1963), U.S. Navy officer
 John Y. Brown Jr. (1933–2022), Governor of Kentucky from 1980 to 1984
 John Brown Jr. (Navajo) (1929–2001), American Navajo Code Talkers
 John Brown Junior (1821–1895), American abolitionist

See also
John Brown II (disambiguation)
John Brown (disambiguation)